Singapore Technologies Engineering Ltd, doing business as ST Engineering, is a Singaporean multinational technology and engineering group in the aerospace, smart city as well as defence and public security sectors. Headquartered in Singapore, the group reported a revenue of S$7.7 billion in FY2021, ranks among the largest companies listed on the Singapore Exchange, and is one of Asia's largest defence and engineering groups. It is a component stock of FTSE Straits Times Index, MSCI Singapore, iEdge SG ESG Transparency Index and iEdge SG ESG Leaders Index. ST Engineering has about 23,000 employees worldwide with two-thirds of its employees in the engineering and technology roles.

History
ST Engineering's history began with its precursor, the Chartered Industries of Singapore, which was established in 1967 by the newly independent Singaporean government as an ammunition manufacturer. Businesses related to aerospace and shipbuilding were later created and put under the ST umbrella. The ST group of companies went commercial in 1990, setting up its first commercial airframe manufacturing, repair and overhaul facilities in Singapore and the United States. ST Engineering was created in December 1997 as a merger of four listed companies: ST Aerospace, ST Electronics, ST Kinetics and ST Marine. Its shares debuted on the Singapore Exchange on 8 December 1997.

Since then, ST Engineering has grown to become one of Asia's largest defence and engineering groups for commercial and defence organisations across multiple industries. In Mar 2007, ST Engineering was ranked 19th in the aerospace & defence industry and 1,661th of 2,000 of the world's largest public companies by Forbes.

Areas of business
ST Engineering is a major player in the defence and military industries. It was ranked Number 61 in the Stockholm International Peace Research Institute's list of the world's top 100 defence manufacturers in 2021. Outside of Singapore, it has sold defence products to over 100 countries, including United States, United Kingdom, Indonesia, Philippines, United Arab Emirates, Brazil, Sweden, India, Thailand and Finland. ST Engineering do not design, produce or sell anti-personnel mines, cluster munitions, white phosphorus munitions and its related key components.

In 2018, the Group harmonised all brands by using "ST Engineering" as a Masterbrand while in 2020, the Group reorganised as Commercial and Defence & Public Security clusters, replacing the sector-structure of Aerospace, Electronics, Land Systems and Marine. ST Engineering's network of subsidiaries and associated companies spans across the Americas, Asia, Europe and the Middle East.

ST Engineering expanded to the United States in 2001, locating its U.S. headquarters in Herndon, Virginia. It operates in 50 cities across 23 states. It was known as VT Systems (VTS; formerly known as Vision Technologies Systems) until 1 July 2019, when VTS was changed to ST Engineering North America as part of the Group’s brand harmonization exercise in 2018.

As of 28 February 2022, Temasek Holdings has a 51.69% shares in ST Engineering.

Core capabilities
ST Engineering's businesses span across the aerospace, smart city, defence and public security sectors.

Aerospace

ST Engineering Aerospace provides provides nose-to-tail lifecycle solutions including aviation asset management  to commercial airlines, airfreight operators  and military operators. It is the world's largest airframe maintenance, repair, and operations (MRO) company, and one of the few with in-house engineering design and development capabilities. On top of MRO capabilities, ST Engineering also has expertise as an OEM specialising in engine nacelle  and composite panels. It is the only company in the world offering Airbus freighter conversions  using OEM data.

Smart City

ST Engineering's technologies and solutions in Smart City addresses the connectivity, mobility, security, infrastructure  and environmental  needs of cities. Its solutions span over rail and road, autonomous and electric vehicles, mobility payment systems, building access and security systems, as well as IoT solutions for lighting, water and energy management. Its Smart City business has a track record of 700 smart city products in over 130 cities worldwide.

In March 2022, ST Engineering completed its acquisition of Transcore to enhance its Smart City solutions through TransCore’s market leading end-to-end tolling solutions and congestion pricing businesses.

Defence & Public Security

ST Engineering's defence business provides integrated defence technologies and critical systems spanning the digital, air, land  and sea  domains. It has over four decades of expertise in the development of military technology and solutions, from aircraft and avionics Avionics upgrades, to designing and building proven battlefield mobility platforms, soldier systems, ammunition and naval vessels.

Its solutions in Public Security cover critical infrastructure, intelligence operations, homeland security applications  and maritime system, which have been implemented in more than 100 cities worldwide.

Controversy

In 2014, ST Engineering and its subsidiaries ST Engineering Marine and ST Engineering Aerospace were hit by one of the largest corruption scandals in Singapore history following investigations by the Corrupt Practices Investigation Bureau.

In December 2014, former ST Engineering Marine and ST Engineering Aerospace president, Chang Cheow Teck, was charged with conspiring with two subordinates to offer bribes in return for ship-repair contracts between 2004 and 2010. The corruption charges were eventually withdrawn and in January 2017, Chang pleaded guilty to "failing to use reasonable diligence in performing his duties" and was given a short detention order of 14 days. Former ST Marine CEO and president See Leong Teck was also charged with seven counts of corruption. In December 2016, See was sentenced to 10 months' jail and a $100,000 fine.

Since then, six other former ST Engineering Marine senior executives were implicated in the corruption scandal, including former financial controller and senior vice-president of finance Ong Tek Liam who pleaded guilty to ten out of 118 charges in relating to the falsification of accounts, former senior vice-president Mok Kim Whang who pleaded guilty to 49 out of 826 corruption charges, ex-chief operating officer Han Yew Kwang who pleaded guilty to 50 out of 407 charges and was sentenced to six months' jail and fined $80,000, former president of commercial business Tan Mong Seng who faced 445 corruption charges and was sentenced to 16 weeks' jail, and ex-financial controller Patrick Lee Swee Ching who pled guilty to seven of 38 charges of conspiring with others between 2004 and 2007 to make false entries in petty cash vouchers, and was given the maximum fine of $210,000.

In June 2017, Ong Teck Liam was sentenced to a fine of SGD300,000 ($217,200), in default 30 weeks’ imprisonment. Ong was the last to be sentenced.

References

1967 establishments in Singapore
Engineering companies of Singapore
Government-owned companies of Singapore
Multinational companies headquartered in Singapore
Temasek Holdings
Companies listed on the Singapore Exchange
Singaporean brands
Singaporean companies established in 1967